Jelena Grkovic (born 30 August 1997) is a Hungarian-Serbian ice hockey player and member of the Hungarian national ice hockey team, currently playing in the European Women's Hockey League (EWHL) with the women's team of MAC Budapest.

She represented Hungary at the 2021 IIHF Women's World Championship.

Career statistics

International

References

External links
 

1997 births
Living people
Hungarian women's ice hockey defencemen
KMH Budapest (women) players
MAC Budapest (women) players
Serbian ice hockey players
Serbian sportswomen
Sportspeople from Novi Sad